"Send It" is a pop, rap and R&B song performed by American singer-songwriter Austin Mahone featuring Rich Homie Quan. It was released on August 18, 2016 by A.M. Music LLC and Mr. 305 as a promotional single.

The song became famous in China after it was adopted in the social media app TikTok. There was a Cantonese version of the song. The song has been streamed over 150K times on the music app Xiami Music.

Background 
The song is about Mahone asking a girl to send him nudes.

Critical response 
Various people have called the song "trashy", "disgusting", and "creepy". Seventeen magazine describes the song as every girl's texting nightmare with lyrics straight out of the "How to Convince a Girl to Send You Nudes handbook", such as "Send it to my phone, send it to my phone / You already know I keep it on the low / Baby, you can trust me, promise I'm alone / I won't tell a soul, send it to my phone." Some have said the song's lyrics make them feel disgusted.

Others have said that many artists talk about sex and nude photos in their songs all the time, and that Mahone is saying what everyone thinks.

Track listing

References 

2016 songs
Austin Mahone songs
Songs written by Austin Mahone